Avvai Shanmugi is a 1996 Indian Tamil-language comedy film directed by K. S. Ravikumar and co-written by Crazy Mohan. The film stars Kamal Haasan and Meena, with Gemini Ganesan, Nagesh, Heera, Manivannan, Nassar, Delhi Ganesh and Ann in supporting roles. Heavily inspired by the American film Mrs Doubtfire (1993), it revolves around a divorcé who disguises as a nanny to be close to his daughter, whose custody is only with his ex-wife.

Avvai Shanmughi was released on 10 November 1996 and became a box office success, winning two Tamil Nadu State Film Awards: Best Make-up Artist (K. M. Sarathkumar) and Best Child Artist (Ann). A year later, the film was remade in Hindi as Chachi 420, with Haasan directing and reprising his role.

Plot 
Janaki, a married woman who lives separated from her husband Pandian, applies for divorce. She offers various reasons for wanting a divorce. She has married Pandian against the wishes of her rich father Vishwanathan Iyer. But she is not able to come to terms with living in Pandian's small house without amenities. Pandian is an assistant dance choreographer with a modest income and is not able to spend much time with the family. All this accumulates and Janaki decides to apply for divorce, which is granted. She has sole custody of their daughter Bharathi, who Pandian can meet only once a week, his only solace. However, Bharathi loves him a lot and dislikes the arrangement.

Basha, Pandian's Muslim friend, advises him to steal his daughter from Janaki. Pandian assents, but in doing so, he is discovered; now he cannot meet her at all. Pandian later learns that Vishwanathan has advertised for a woman to look after his granddaughter. In conversation with Joseph, a makeup artist, Pandian gets the idea of playing an old woman, so that he can be with Bharathi and Janaki without them knowing. Joseph agrees to this plan and the transformation is done from Pandian to "Avvai Shanmugi", a dignified, elderly Iyer woman.

Shanmugi applies for the job, but is rejected as another woman had been chosen. But when Bharathi is hurt shooting fireworks and catches fire, Shanmugi throws her into the swimming pool against the wishes of the household, who believe that wrapping in woollens is the proper way to put out a fire. When a doctor comes to take a look at Bharathi's wound, he praises Shanmugi for administering the right treatment, which causes Vishwanathan to reject the earlier hired nanny and hire Shanmugi. Soon after that, all the family members start to become closer to Shanmugi, including Janaki and Barathi. When Bharathi gets to properly meet Shanmugi, she recognises her father almost immediately, but agrees not to reveal his secret.

Rathna is a girl who is in love with Pandian, but is constantly rebuffed. Basha takes up the role of a mute Iyer cook and is admitted into Vishwanathan's house on the recommendation of Shanmugi. However, Basha is caught later while doing his namaz, thereby blowing his cover. Hilarious circumstances follow and slowly Shanmugi manages to convince the household of her sincerity. So much so that Vishwanathan begins to develop a liking for Shanmugi and in fact proposes to her too. Around the same time, Mudaliyar, the house-owner of the place where Pandian lives, happens to bump into Shanmugi and sympathises with her for being a widow. Eventually, Mudaliyar too begins to develop a liking for her.

Meanwhile, Pandian slowly begins to realise that Janaki has not totally forgotten him. Shanmugi rebuffs Vishwanathan's proposals by saying that her husband is alive. Adding to the chaos, she tells Vishwanathan that Joseph is her husband; while Pandian tells Sethuramar, Vishwanathan's secretary, that Mudaliyar is Shanmugi's husband. There is much confusion after this, but it is resolved at last. Shanmugi convinces Vishwanathan that Janaki's right place is by her husband. While Viswanathan goes off to talk to his estranged son-in-law, Shanmugi reveals her true self as Pandian to Basha by removing her blouse. This is seen by Janaki, who misunderstands the scene and believes Shanmugi to be a seductress.

Janaki goes to Pandian's house to reclaim him, but upon seeing Rathna waiting there, and Shanmugi's clothes lying around, thinks that her husband, too, is promiscuous. Janaki leaves and attempts suicide by jumping into a river, but Shanmugi stops her. Shanmugi reveals her identity as Pandian. Janaki and Pandian reconcile, while Pandian "kills off" Shanmugi by attributing her "death" to drowning while attempting to save Janaki from committing suicide.

Cast 

 Kamal Haasan as Avvai Shanmugi / Pandiyan
 Meena as Janaki (dubbed by Uma Bharani)
 Gemini Ganesan as Vishwanathan Iyer
 Nagesh as Joseph
 Manivannan as Sambantham Mudaliyar
 Nassar as Basha
 Delhi Ganesh as Sethurama Iyer
 Heera as Rathna (dubbed by Savitha Radhakrishan)
 Rani as Kousi
 Anne as Bharathi
 Bayilvan Ranganathan
 Idichapuli Selvaraj
 Kavithalayaa Krishnan as a lawyer
 S. P. Balasubrahmanyam as Doctor Subbu (special appearance)
 Raghuram as himself (special appearance)
 Crazy Mohan as interviewer (special appearance)
 Ramesh Aravind as himself (special appearance)
 Neelu as Judge
 Kanal Kannan as a rogue
 Peter Hein as a fighter (uncredited)
 K. S. Ravikumar as a spectator
 Kovai Senthil (uncredited)

Production

Development 
Jijo Punnoose wanted to make a film starring Kamal Haasan as a man dressed as a woman, but Haasan refused as the role was an adolescent woman whereas he wanted to play an elderly woman. Haasan later desired to do a film inspired by the American films Kramer vs. Kramer (1979) and Tootsie (1982) which became Avvai Shanmughi. He acknowledged the film's resemblance to another American film Mrs. Doubtfire (1993), but "I guess we were both inspired from the same source" since he had the idea for Avvai Shanmughi six years before the release of Mrs. Doubtfire. Haasan dedicated the film to his mentor stage actor 'Avvai' T. K. Shanmugam, who was known for playing female roles in stage plays.

Casting 
Sivaji Ganesan was Haasan's initial choice for the role of Vishwanatha Iyer, but he was unable to commit due to his ill health; the role went to Gemini Ganesan (no relation). A debutant Sri Durga was initially chosen to play the character Rathna, but was ultimately replaced by Heera. Haasan's daughter Akshara was considered for playing the lead pair's daughter, but declined; the role went to Ann, her feature film debut. Stunt master Kanal Kannan appeared in a small role of a street rogue. Maadhu Balaji was offered to act in the film, but declined.

Design 
The make-up artist Michael Westmore provided advice for the film alongside K. M. Sarathkumar. An initial photoshoot had Haasan dressed as a middle-aged woman, but it was later decided that he portray elderly woman. The padding and foundation used gave Haasan an allergic reaction beneath his eyes. The make-up took five hours to put on and lasts for only five more hours. Haasan wore a nine-yard saree in the film for the female character, with Sarika contributing to the costume designing.

Soundtrack 
The music of the film was composed by Deva and the lyrics were written by Vaali. The song "Rukku Rukku" is based on the Carnatic raga Sahana. The song "Velai Velai" is inspired from "Workaholic" by 2 Unlimited. The song "Kadhala Kadhala" was reused as "Gham Hai Kyon" in the Hindi film Hamara Dil Aapke Paas Hai (2000), with change of instrumentation.

Release and reception 

Avvai Shanmughi was released on 10 November 1996, and performed well at the box office. The Hindu praised the film, claiming it "turns out to be entertainer, mouthful from start to finish". The reviewer praised Haasan's portrayal of a woman by claiming that "few peers to Kamal Hassan who can do the female role with such perfection". Ananda Vikatan gave the film a score of 44 out of 100. The film won two Tamil Nadu State Film Awards: Best Make-up Artist (K. M. Sarathkumar) and Best Child Artist (Ann).

Legacy 
Avvai Shanmughi became a "textbook example" in Tamil cinema for slapstick humour. A year later, the film was remade in Hindi as Chachi 420, with Haasan directing and reprising his role. The scene where Pandiyan looks for a sign board to think of a name for his elderly woman getup is recreated in Remo (2016) where Sivakarthikeyan's character looks at a sign board for his nurse getup.

References

Bibliography

External links 

 

1990s Tamil-language films
1996 comedy films
1996 films
Cross-dressing in Indian films
Films directed by K. S. Ravikumar
Films scored by Deva (composer)
Films shot in South Africa
Films with screenplays by Crazy Mohan
Indian comedy films
Indian remakes of American films
Tamil films remade in other languages